Gabriel Henrique Pierini (born 4 May 2000) is a Brazilian professional footballer who plays as a midfielder for Confiança, on loan from Cuiabá.

Club career
Pierini played for Cruzeiro, Atlético Mineiro, América Mineiro, Luverdense, Cuiabá and Flamengo as a youth. He made his senior debut in the 2017 Copa FMF with Luverdense, and first started to appear with Cuiabá in the same competition the following year, as the latter used an under-20 squad in the entire tournament.

Pierini was promoted to Cuiabá's first team squad for the 2020 campaign, and played his first match on 29 January 2020, in a 1–0 Campeonato Mato-Grossense away win against former club Luverdense. After being only a backup option, he made his Série B debut on 24 November, coming on as a first-half substitute for injured Lucas Hernández in a 0–2 away loss against Confiança, but also left the match due to an injury late on.

On 11 December 2020, Pierini renewed his contract until 2023.

Career statistics

References

External links
MovMent Pro profile 

2000 births
Living people
Brazilian footballers
Association football midfielders
Campeonato Brasileiro Série B players
Luverdense Esporte Clube players
Cuiabá Esporte Clube players
Grêmio Esportivo Brasil players
Volta Redonda FC players
Associação Desportiva Confiança players